Alexander Michael Karev, (né Evans), M.D., F.A.C.S is a fictional character on the ABC television series Grey's Anatomy, portrayed by actor Justin Chambers. Introduced as a surgical intern at the fictional Seattle Grace Hospital, Karev eventually obtained the position of resident, later becoming a pediatric surgeon. He then becomes Interim Chief of surgery for a six-month period while Bailey is on a "stress sabbatical". The relationships among colleagues Meredith Grey (Ellen Pompeo), Cristina Yang (Sandra Oh), Izzie Stevens (Katherine Heigl) and George O'Malley (T. R. Knight) formed a focal point of the series.

The character is initially disliked by his fellow interns, and is often accused of being brusque and dismissive with his patients and co-workers. As a resident, Karev's negative attitude, temper and rudeness occasionally earned the ire of the attendings. Former neonatal surgeon Addison Montgomery requested him on her service as punishment for his rudeness to her and neurosurgeon Derek Shepherd, amongst others, throwing him out of their service for his inappropriate comments about patients. He then demonstrates profound skill for the pediatric surgery for the rest of the series. As the character developed, he displayed more empathy for patients and was shown to have a gift for connecting with young children, despite his repeated claims to dislike them. In the fifteenth-season premiere, Alex becomes interim Chief of Surgery after Miranda Bailey takes a sabbatical. In the sixteenth season, Alex leaves the hospital 
to be with Izzie Stevens and their children making his final appearance in the season 16 episode "Leave a Light On."

Storylines
Alex's mother had a mental illness, and his father was often absent, as well as often becoming violent towards him and his mother. Alex began wrestling in high school, and eventually physically confronted his father, after which, his father did not return. Alex has a younger brother, Aaron, and a younger sister, Amber; they were all placed in foster care for 5 years. Though Aaron and Amber only had a few foster families, Alex went through 17 foster families in 5 years before he reunited with his siblings. It is revealed in later seasons that Aaron was diagnosed with schizophrenia and tried to kill Amber. Alex was present when Aaron had to be committed to a psychiatric ward.

Alex secured a position in the surgical residency program at Seattle Grace Hospital after graduating from the University of Iowa. He initially makes a poor impression meeting his fellow interns Meredith Grey (Ellen Pompeo), Cristina Yang (Sandra Oh), George O'Malley (T.R. Knight) and Izzie Stevens (Katherine Heigl) whom he later taunts when he discovers she used to be a lingerie model. After initial disagreements, Alex reveals to Izzie that his father was a heroin addict who used to beat his mother. He became a wrestler so he could defend his mother, and attended university on a wrestling scholarship. He and Izzie begin a friendship. At the end of the first season, George contracts syphilis from Alex through nurse Olivia Harper, causing animosity between the two.

Alex asks Izzie out on a date, but he is thrown by the news that he has failed his medical board exams. Izzie is offended since he pays no attention to her during their date and so informs him that she no longer wants to go out with him. He later freezes during an emergency operation, needing George to take over from him. Alex's relationship with Izzie is damaged when he experiences erectile dysfunction with her. He goes on to sleep with Olivia again, and is caught by Izzie and they break up. After retaking his exams, Alex manages to pass, and reunites with Izzie after a bomb scare in the hospital. They break up again, however, when Izzie falls for cardiothoracic patient Denny Duquette.

Alex helps Izzie recover from Denny's death and tries to rekindle their relationship but Izzie backs away, since she is still in the process of getting over her loss and they remain friends. Alex spends a period of time working under neonatal surgeon Dr. Addison Montgomery (Kate Walsh), and though he is later released to work for plastic surgeon Dr. Mark Sloan (Eric Dane), he finds his interest returning to Addison's specialty. Addison is attracted to Alex, and the two share a kiss and later sleep together.

In the aftermath of a ferry accident, Alex rescues a pregnant woman (Elizabeth Reaser) who awakens with amnesia, and grows close to Alex as he helps her forge an identity for herself, picking out the name Ava. After she gives birth to her daughter, Ava's memory eventually returns, although she tries to hide it from Alex, as she had recently left a bad marriage. He convinces her to tell him her true identity, and she reveals herself to be Rebecca Pope. Alex turns her down after realizing she's married, feeling that he is not good enough for her.

Rebecca returns and she and Alex sleep together before she goes back to her husband. Alex has a brief relationship with intern Lexie Grey (Chyler Leigh), but chooses to be with Rebecca, when she returns and tells him she is pregnant. After Rebecca attempted suicide, Izzie convinces Alex to admit her for psychiatric help, due to Rebecca's hallucinations of her pregnancy. Alex later breaks down in Izzie's arms, and the two kiss.

Later in their relationship, Izzie begins hallucinating about Denny, and uncovers the fact she has Stage 4 metastatic melanoma with an estimated chance of 5% survival. It is revealed that Izzie's hallucinations of Denny are, in fact, caused by her tumor. Alex is shocked by the news, but finds the strength to stay by her side. Izzie plans a wedding for Meredith and Derek, but when Derek finds Izzie has another inoperable tumor in her brain, they give the wedding to Izzie and Alex, who marry in front of all their friends. Izzie debates whether or not she should undergo a risky surgery to remove her tumor and Alex supports her, but eventually insists that she should have the surgery. Alex performs CPR on Izzie after she flatlines.

Izzie returns to work, but is soon fired for making a treatment error that endangered the life of a patient, leaving Alex a Dear John letter and no clue as to her whereabouts. She later returns to the hospital, when she found out Alex wasn't the cause of her getting fired and went to make amends with him. She tells him she no longer has cancer and Alex says he is happy for her but he deserved someone who would stay. Izzie then leaves Seattle to start fresh and sends Alex divorce papers a few episodes later. Alex re-kindles an old flame with Lexie. Alex seems to have recently found that his calling is actually Peds and not Plastics, as he had decided in the earlier seasons. Seeing Alex's ability to handle child patients, Dr. Arizona Robbins shows an interest in mentoring him for that specialization. Alex's brother Aaron comes to Seattle Grace for surgery, and lots of painful memories resurface because of this. Meredith discovers Alex, along with Aaron and their sister Amber, had been in foster care for five years when their mother could not take care of them.

Alex is shot in the hospital by a deceased patient's husband, but survives with the help of Lexie and Mark. While undergoing treatment, he asked for Izzie and told her never to leave again.  Following the shooting, Lexie has a mental breakdown in front of Alex and he walks away. Dr. Bailey bars Alex from surgery until he has the bullet removed, which he later allows her to do. Alex realizes that his passion lies in pediatric surgery. He is further shown to be excellent with children, comforting with a young patient while growing her a new trachea. He immediately gets on the wrong side of new Pediatric attending, Stark while Arizona is on leave. Alex is thrilled when Arizona returns from Africa and hopes she will come to work for the hospital again. In the meantime, Alex falls for the new OBGYN attending, Lucy Fields, and  they start a relationship after she kisses him. Alex finds out about Meredith sabotaging her Alzheimer's clinical trial and rats her out, in attempt to get Chief Resident.

The adoption counselor takes away Zola, the child Meredith wanted to adopt. Realizing his mistake, Alex apologizes to Meredith, who forgives him shortly after. As the end of the fifth year of residency is near, the surgical residents, including Alex, prepare for their board exams for the different fellowships they plan on joining. Though Alex is late for his exam, because he had to treat a patient, he ends up passing. Dr. Webber tells him that Johns Hopkins Hospital, which has the top program in the country, has been very impressed with him during his boards and has decided to create a position in pediatrics surgery for him and accepts the position. After finding out his decision, his current boss, Dr. Arizona Robbins, yells at him and takes his place on a plane that later crashes.

Following the rescue of his colleagues, Robbins' health deteriorates and causes her leg to be amputated. He extends his stay at Seattle Grace until a replacement for Robbins is found, but when he learns that the replacement will send the exchange program to UCLA, he decides not to leave. Karev buys Meredith's old house from her, and Cristina becomes his roommate. Karev forms a friendship with a new intern, Jo Wilson, that eventually develops into romantic feelings towards each other. Alex admits his love for Jo, and the two kiss and become a couple.

Alex's estranged father, Jimmy, who he hasn't seen in 18 years, is admitted to the ER as a patient. Unknowing that Alex is his son, Jimmy confides in Alex that he had another family that he hasn't seen in years. This made Alex upset and he punches Jimmy at the bar. His father returns, experiencing symptoms of withdrawal and hallucinations of the past, where more is revealed about Alex's childhood. Jimmy tells Alex he knows that he is his son and Alex yells at him. His dad later goes into cardiac arrest and is brought into surgery, his fate is unknown. Alex kisses Jo at April's wedding, wanting to start a family with her. That night, his dad dies, due to a mistake by intern, Shane Ross, and Alex is upset. He punches Ross and is later comforted by Meredith.

Upon the completion of his fellowship in Pediatric Surgery, Alex is given an offer to work at Dr. Oliver Lebackes' private practice office, claiming that he will have more flexible hours and "a big fat paycheck". He later discovers that he isn't happy working at the private practice and expresses a desire to return full-time to Grey Sloan. When Cristina leaves for Switzerland, she leaves Alex her share of the board, including her seat.

Alex is fired by Dr. Lebackes, when Maggie Pierce accidentally reveals to him that Karev was thinking about leaving the job. Webber recommended Bailey to fill Yang's board seat after she left, so Bailey and Alex fight over the chair. They both make presentations to the board and eventually Bailey wins, with a unanimous vote in her favor. He is hired back as an attending pediatric surgeon and takes over full-time as Arizona pursues a fellowship with Dr. Herman. Alex continues to date Jo and his friendship with Meredith grows stronger than ever, with him taking on the role of her new person. When Derek dies and Meredith runs away, Alex is upset by her leaving without telling him where she went and calls her every day. Eventually she calls him, tells him she is okay, and to stop calling. When she goes into labor and gives birth to Ellis Shepherd, Alex goes to see her since he is her emergency contact. She asks to move back in with him in her old house. Alex sells Meredith back the house and he and Jo rent a loft. In the third episode of the twelfth season, Jo finds an invoice from the fertility clinic, housing Izzie and Alex's frozen embryos. She then gets jealous of Alex wanting to have babies with Izzie.

Alex and Jo continue to struggle with their relationship. When Karev proposes to her, Jo tells him she can't marry him, so he breaks up with her. Later, Alex realizes that he misses Jo and gets her back. They seem to be doing well for some time, until Alex brings up marriage again and the two fight, as Jo still continues to argue that she cannot marry him. Alex storms out, leaving their relationship uncertain. Meredith and Alex lie on the grass and talk about love. On Jo rejecting his proposal, Alex then wonders, if he'll get only one soulmate/true love and refers to Izzie. Meredith then tells him Izzie wasn't his true love and Alex told her Izzie was his Derek. During Owen and Amelia's wedding, Alex realizes that even though she won't marry him, he loves Jo and goes back to her again. However, when he arrives at their loft, he finds Jo highly intoxicated, wearing nothing but her bra and underwear, and surgical intern, Andrew Deluca, lying on top of her. Alex assumes that Deluca was attempting to take advantage of Jo while she was inebriated and is filled with rage. He beats Deluca to a pulp with his bare hands.

Andrew is badly injured, Alex realizes what he's done and quickly rushes Deluca to the hospital. There, the doctors call the police as they struggle to save Andrew and discover who did this to him. Alex lies to everyone and says that he found Andrew in this state and brought him to Grey Sloan. However, Ben Warren is suspicious of Karev. Meredith also quickly realizes that Alex was in fact the one who beat Deluca. She covers for him and the two continue to lie to everyone in the hospital about Alex's actions. Soon, Karev learns that Andrew wasn't doing anything wrong and that he had beaten up a good guy. Meredith decides that even though she loves Alex, she needs to turn him in. She goes to Bailey and tells her the truth. But, when the two rush to the police they find Alex being arrested for aggravated assault, as he had turned himself in. He is taken to jail and Meredith bails him out. While they wait for a trial, Bailey suspends Alex as an attending and makes him work in the clinic. Eventually, Jo finally tells Alex that the reason she couldn't marry Alex is because she is already married. Her husband is abusive and so she ran away and changed her name to Jo Wilson so that he wouldn't find her. Alex realizes that when Jo is called to the stand as a witness in the trial, this information about her past and lack of records under the name Jo Wilson may be revealed, and when the information goes public, her husband may find her. To keep her safe, he decides to take the plea deal without a trial, ensuring that he goes to jail for 2 years. However, when Alex tells Meredith this, she begs him not to and tells him that she can't lose him because she's already lost everyone else important in her life. Alex struggles to decide whether or not to take the plea deal.

Meredith finds that the trial had been put off indefinitely. She assumes that he took the plea, and began calling and visiting various local jails to find him. After a full day of searching without finding him, she goes home to sleep and discovers him sleeping in her bed. He explains he slept there all day. He explains that during his meeting with the D.A., Deluca came in and dropped all charges.

After returning to work, Alex and Jo try to ignore each other and eventually build up a tolerance of sorts towards each other. Deluca and Alex continue to be at odds. At the end of the season, Alex hires an investigator to look for Jo's abusive husband. The investigator finds him and tells Alex that he will be at a conference. Meredith tells him it's a horrible idea and that he shouldn't go, especially considering Jo doesn't know about the situation. Alex flies out to the conference with the intention of telling him to get out of her life, no matter the means. When he meets him, Alex decides against confronting him over Jo, avoiding exposing her current identity and location and potentially stopping himself from assaulting someone yet again.

At the start of season 14, Alex and Jo start to warm up to each other. Jo tells Deluca that she is still in love with Alex. Alex goes to Jo and tells her that he could never abuse her like her husband did because he dealt with the same trauma as a kid as his father was abusive. He then tells her that he found her husband. Jo is taken aback by this, but when Alex tells her that he didn't kill or injure him in any way, she is relieved and finally trusts him again. They then restart their relationship and Jo is now encouraged to file for divorce against her abusive husband. In the seventh episode, there was a pregnant Izzie look alike and Alex is taken aback and stammers when he talks to her. In the twenty-second episode, he finds out about his mom because she was not depositing the checks he had been sending to her. When he went to Iowa to meet her mom, he finds out that she is completely fine and doing well in her life. Initially, he is angry with her being well because it let him have a bad childhood, but after talking to Jo, he forgives her and invites her to Seattle Grace for his marriage. In the finale, he finally marries Jo.

In the 15th season, he and Jo are about to move to Boston for Jo's fellowship but then, she finally stays in Grey-Sloan Memorial Hospital. Meanwhile, Dr. Bailey needed some time from her position as Chief so she announced Alex as interim Chief of Grey-Sloan Memorial hospital for 6 months. Jo tells him that her birth mother lives in Pittsburgh and flies there to meet her. After coming back, she doesn't talk about it to Alex and even stops going to work, which makes Alex worry. Later, he knew about her mental health and sends her to rehab for a month, where Jo gives him the opportunity to back off from the relationship because they were not legally married. Throughout, Alex helped Meredith to do fraud with an insurance company to save a girl's life and for that, Alex is fired from his position as the head of pediatric surgery at the end of the season. The following season, he marries Jo for a second time and helps save Meredith from losing her medical license. Midway through season 16, he disappeared to Iowa to see his mom, but it was revealed in the episode "Leave a Light On", Alex reconnected with Izzie, in the weeks leading up to Meredith's trial seeking her medical license to be reinstated. It was during that process that he chose to reach out to Izzie because he wanted to know if she was alive, okay, and willing to be there in person for Meredith's trial. During the call, Alex heard two young voices in the background. It was then he discovered that Izzie had taken the embryos they had frozen during her cancer treatment and moved forward with IVF five to six years earlier and that they were his kids. He ultimately leaves Jo for Izzie and moves to Kansas to be with her and their children.

Development

Casting and creation
 Justin Chambers was not included in the original pilot episode filmed in March 2004. Tony Phelan stated: "One of the notes after the pilot test was: "You need a bad boy. You need a male member of the intern class who's not just an asshole, but male". As a result, Phelan stated, "If you go back and watch the pilot, you can see how they surgically put Justin in everywhere."

On January 10, 2020, Justin Chambers announced that he had departed the series after 15 years, in order to pursue other acting opportunities as well as to focus on his family. His final episode aired on November 14, 2019. The fate of his character was addressed in the season 16 episode "Leave a Light On."

Characterization
The American Broadcasting Company (ABC) characterized Karev as "honest", "always tells it like it is", while also citing his mouth, his punctuality and him being a "smart-ass" as his weaknesses. Shonda Rhimes said of Karev: "I love that we have a character who can do something wonderful but still be a selfish cranky ass about it. Alex gets to be complex in ways most characters don't because even though he's got a moral code, his moral code is totally twisted and dark. But he's essentially good – deep down inside." Carolina Paiz, one of the writers of the series, wrote: "He has so much going on inside... you think you've got him figured out but then he just reveals this whole other side to him."

"He is superficial sleazeball who turns out to be a nice guy and a talented doctor with an amazing bedside manner, as well as the budding love interest of Katherine Heigl's character Izzie." DVD Verdict wrote of the character's development in the fourth season: "Love him, hate him, or both, Karev speaks his mind, rough edges and all. But ultimately his cold heart seems to be softened by his blossoming relationship with Jane Doe/Ava/Rebecca." Rhimes felt that the 100th episode during which Karev marries Stevens showed how he had grown up: "Look at him. Standing at the altar and saying those vows like a man. (...) He's become a man who can step up. And I love him for it."

Relationships
Although Karev and Stevens had an on-off romantic history in previous seasons, it was not until the fifth season that the two formed a lasting relationship. Despite Stevens' advanced skin cancer, the two marry. Justin Chambers commented on his character's inability to tell Stevens that he loves her in the beginning of their relationship, saying that Karev has difficulty expressing himself. Though Stevens departs in season 6, series creator Shonda Rhimes has said that she would like the chance to create closure for both Karev and Stevens. Rhimes later retracted her comments and stated that she has no plans to ever re-approach Izzie's storyline again. In the ninth season, Karev befriends intern Jo Wilson. They begin a relationship in the tenth season until their break-up in the twelfth season. However, they get back together again and marry in the fourteenth season. Karev later leaves Jo and gets back together with his ex-wife Izzie Stevens in season 16.

Reception
Analyzing Alex Karev, Rachel Simon called him "underrated;" she pointed out that Alex's personal growth never seems to get acknowledged, as "Alex begins Grey's as an arrogant, obnoxious intern who pushes away anyone who tries to care about him. He breaks Izzie's heart 1,000 times, and then acts surprised when she falls for someone else. He sleeps with any girl who will have him, insults everyone who doesn't, and generally enjoys being the hospital asshole. Yet, over the course of 10 seasons Alex has evolved, slowly and realistically, into a genuinely good person whose faults don't miraculously disappear, but take a backseat to much better qualities."

Former television columnist for The Star-Ledger Alan Sepinwall disapproved of Karev's flirt with Addison as "he should take interest in a woman's speciality and respect his boss without getting in her pants." Reviewing the fifth season, Chris Monfette of IGN wrote: "Alex, who'd become simply the cast's angry outcast, was uplifted as his relationship with Izzie became more and more substantial, and his bedside scenes with her toward the end were some of his character's best material yet."

On his career path as a pediatric surgeon, Examiner wrote, "Despite his rough exterior, Alex has a certain child-like innocence and need for acceptance. He is keen in recognizing these traits in kids, as well. He reaches out to kids on many levels." and added, "Alex has major trust issues. Maybe it was the constant beatings from his father. Or, his mother's mental illness. Or, being shuffled through 17 foster homes over a 5-year period. Who wouldn't have issues with a childhood like that?"

References 

Specific

General

External links 
Grey's Anatomy at ABC.com

Grey's Anatomy characters
Fictional surgeons
Fictional characters from Iowa
Television characters introduced in 2005
Crossover characters in television
Male characters in television